International House is a 1933 American pre-Code comedy film starring Peggy Hopkins Joyce and W. C. Fields, directed by A. Edward Sutherland and released by Paramount Pictures. The tagline of the film was "The Grand Hotel of comedy". It is a mixture of comedy and musical acts tied together by a slim plot line, in the style of the Big Broadcast pictures that were also released by Paramount during the 1930s. In addition to some typical comedic lunacy from W. C. Fields and Burns and Allen (George Burns and Gracie Allen), it provides a snapshot of some popular stage and radio acts of the era. The film includes some risqué pre-Code humor. The cast also features Cab Calloway with his orchestra and Bela Lugosi.

Plot
At International House, a large hotel in metropolitan Wuhu, China Chinese inventor Dr. Wong (Edmund Breese) is soliciting bids for the rights to his "radioscope", a kind of television. Unlike real television, his contraption does not need a camera; it can look in on events anywhere in the world as if it were a ground-penetrating electronic telescope, complete with audio.

Prof. Henry R. Quail (W. C. Fields) is one of many people from around the world converging on the hotel, though he is one of the few not hoping to buy (or steal) Dr. Wong's invention, as he was intending to land in Kansas City in his autogyro but flew off course. Also converging on the hotel are four-times-divorced American celebrity Peggy Hopkins Joyce (playing herself) avoiding one of her ex-husbands, violently jealous Russian General Petronovich (Bela Lugosi); Tommy (Stuart Erwin), the representative of an American electric company, hoping to buy Wong's invention and finally wed his sweetheart Carol (Sari Maritza); resident physician Dr. Burns (George Burns) and his goofy aide Nurse Allen (Gracie Allen) dealing with a quarantine on the hotel; and the exasperation of the hotel's fussy and frustrated manager (Franklin Pangborn).

Dr. Wong is particularly eager to look in on a six-day indoor bicycle race in New York, but instead somehow brings in performances by popular crooner Rudy Vallée, bandleader-vocalist Cab Calloway, and precocious torch singer Baby Rose Marie, and comedians Stoopnagle and Budd. A floor show (featuring Sterling Holloway and Lona Andre) is also performed in the hotel's rooftop garden restaurant.

Ultimately, Tommy wins both the rights to the radioscope and his sweetheart, and Peggy Hopkins Joyce, having learned that Prof. Quail is a millionaire, quickly attaches herself to her next sugar daddy. Prof. Quail and his new companion are chased as he drives his little American Austin automobile through several public areas of the hotel and down several flights of a fire escape before driving it back into the hold of his autogyro and taking off.

Cast

Actors
Peggy Hopkins Joyce as herself
W. C. Fields as Prof. Henry R. Quail
Stuart Erwin - Tommy Nash
George Burns - Doctor Burns
Gracie Allen - Nurse Allen
Sari Maritza - Carol Fortescue
Lumsden Hare - Sir Mortimer Fortescue
Bela Lugosi - Gen. Nicholas Petronovich
Franklin Pangborn - Hotel Manager
Edmund Breese - Dr. Wong, Chinese inventor

Performers
Stoopnagle and Budd - F. Chase Taylor and Budd Hulick
Rudy Vallee as himself
Cab Calloway as himself, with his band
Baby Rose Marie as herself
Lona Andre as China Teacup
Sterling Holloway as Coffee Mug

Production

Pre-Code elements
International House was produced before a strict Hollywood Production Code took effect in July 1934, and it is notable for the kind of risqué subject matter, humor and costumes associated with Pre-Code Hollywood. Top-billed Peggy Hopkins Joyce was famous as an unabashed real-life gold-digger, not as an actress. Her many affairs with and several marriages to wealthy older men earned her millions, and in the film she makes several humorous references to her profitable divorces, a topic that would become almost completely off-limits with enforcement of the Code. Several of the "cellophane" costumes in the "She Was a China Tea-cup" production number allow the bare outlines of breasts to be seen, a degree of nudity that the Code would not permit.

The setting of Wuhu, China also serves as a play on "Woo-hoo!", an exclamation which at that time was sometimes used to comment that something was sexually naughty. Hearing the city's name, W. C. Fields, as Professor Quail, responds to what he mistakes as homosexual flirting with "Don't let the posy fool you", referring to his own boutonniere, which he plucks out and tosses away. Walking down a hotel corridor, Fields pauses to peep through a keyhole, then comments, "What won't they think of next!" Such implications of what the Code called "sex perversion" (usually defined then as anything other than procreative sex in the missionary position) would soon be strictly prohibited. This was one of several films in which Fields tweaked censors' noses with one particular deniable double entendre. Sitting next to him in a small car, Joyce (whom he has punningly called "my little Laplander") squirms uncomfortably and tells him she is sitting on something. After saying "I lost mine in the stock market" Fields checks, finds a cat under her, and exclaims, "Ah, it's a pussy!"

Performing with his hot dance band, Cab Calloway sings "Reefer Man", which describes the odd behavior and ravings of the titular heavy marijuana smoker (portrayed by bass player Al Morgan, who performs as if in a trance). In one gag, W. C. Fields enters a scene contentedly smoking an opium pipe (but with a cigar in place of the opium) and commenting, "They stupefy! They're roasted!", a play on two then-current cigarette advertising slogans. References to recreational drug use were among the many Legion of Decency thou-shalt-nots that would soon be rigidly enforced.

In the sequence with the Austin – the smallest car sold in America at that time – W. C. Fields remarks that it "used to belong to the Postmaster General." This was a potshot at Will Hays, the diminutive former Postmaster General who was then trying to enforce an essentially voluntary and often disregarded early Production Code.

Earthquake
On March 10, 1933, an earthquake occurred during production, and a Paramount newsreel featured what was presented as footage of cast members on the set reacting as it struck. A documentary featurette on W. C. Fields accompanying the film's DVD release, however, reveals that Fields and director Sutherland faked the footage for the publicity. The actual earthquake, centered off nearby Long Beach, caused widespread major damage to unreinforced masonry and about 120 consequent fatalities. A 1976 episode of the television series "In Search Of..." that dealt with earthquakes showed the footage.

Music
Lyricist Leo Robin and composer Ralph Rainger wrote three songs for the film: "She Was a China Tea-cup and He Was Just a Mug", performed offscreen by an unidentified male vocalist; "Thank Heaven For You", sung onscreen by Rudy Vallee; and "My Bluebird's Singing the Blues",
sung onscreen by Baby Rose Marie (at a UCLA screening of the restored film at the Billy Wilder Theatre on March 10, 2013, Rose Marie indicated that her song was filmed in New York at the Astoria studio and she had no contact with the Hollywood players). A fourth Robin-Rainger song, "Look What I've Got", originally featured in the slightly earlier film A Bedtime Story, is heard as an instrumental, supposedly played by "Ah Phooey and His Manly Mandarins" in a broadcast from a radio station that calls itself "The Voice of Long Tung"; it provides the musical accompaniment for an otherwise silent he-and-she undressing scene. Cab Calloway and His Harlem Maniacs perform 1932's "Reefer Man", written by Andy Razaf (lyrics) and J. Russell Robinson (music).

Release

Home media
In 1996, Universal Studios Home Video released the film on VHS. In 2004, it was released on Region 1 DVD as part of the five-disc W. C. Fields Comedy Collection set.

Restoration
In 2013, International House was preserved to a polyester dupe negative by the UCLA Film & Television Archive. It was copied from the excellent Paramount 35mm nitrate studio answer print, the lowest generation surviving copy. The audio was re-recorded and denoised, revealing very high fidelity. The Cab Calloway "Reefer Man" number proved to be dubbed 4 dB louder than the rest of the film, giving the Calloway band an infectious, powerful musical presence. This print premiered in the UCLA Festival of Preservation in 2013 and subsequently toured extensively to archival venues.

References

External links 
International House at American Film Institute (archived)

1933 films
1933 comedy films
American black-and-white films
American comedy films
Films directed by A. Edward Sutherland
Films set in China
Films set in hotels
Paramount Pictures films
1930s English-language films
1930s American films
English-language comedy films